Beatrice Evelyn Varley (11 July 1896 – 4 July 1964) was an English actress who appeared in television and film roles between 1936 and 1964. She made her screen debut in the 1936 film Tomorrow We Live and began to portray a variety of character roles in films such as Oh, Mr Porter!, Holiday Camp and The Wicked Lady before moving predominantly into television until she died in 1964.

Selected filmography

 Tomorrow We Live (1936) - Patricia's Mother (uncredited)
 Spring Handicap (1937) - Mrs. Tulip
 Oh, Mr Porter! (1937) - Barney's Bar Landlady (uncredited)
 Young and Innocent (1937) - Accused Man's Wife in First Court Case (uncredited)
 Crackerjack (1938) - Bit Role (uncredited)
 Poison Pen (1939) - Mrs. Jenkins
 Inspector Hornleigh on Holiday (1939) - Mrs. Mooney (uncredited)
 Kipps (1941) - Mrs. Kipps
 Rush Hour (1941, Short) - Shopper (uncredited)
 South American George (1941) - Mrs. Butters
 Hatter's Castle (1942) - Mrs. Brodie
 Secret Mission (1942) - Mrs. Donkin - the British Cook
 Talk About Jacqueline (1942) - (uncredited)
 Squadron Leader X (1943) - Mrs. Krohn
 We Dive at Dawn (1943) - Mrs. Dabbs (uncredited)
 The Bells Go Down (1943) - Ma Turk
 The Man in Grey (1943) - Gipsy
 I'll Walk Beside You (1943) - Miss McKenzie
 Millions Like Us  (1943) - Miss Wells
 Bees in Paradise (1944) - Moagga
 Welcome, Mr. Washington (1944) - Martha
 Love Story (1944) - Miss Rossiter
 Waterloo Road (1945) - Mrs. Colter
 Great Day (1945) - Miss Tracy
 The Agitator (1945) - Mrs. Shackleton
 Johnny Frenchman (1945) - Mrs. Tremayne
 The Seventh Veil (1945) - (uncredited)
 The Wicked Lady (1945) - Aunt Moll
 Bedelia (1946) - Mary
 Send for Paul Temple (1946) - Miss Marchment
 The Upturned Glass (1947) - Injured Girl's Mother
 They Made Me a Fugitive (1947) - Farmer's Wife (uncredited)
 So Well Remembered (1947) - Annie
 Holiday Camp (1947) - Valerie's Aunt
 Jassy (1947) - Mrs. Wicks
 Master of Bankdam (1947) - Mrs. Pickersgill
 The Little Ballerina (1947) - Mrs. Field
 My Brother Jonathan (1948) - Mrs. Hodgkiss
 Good-Time Girl (1948) - Mrs. Rawlings
 My Brother's Keeper (1948) - Mrs. Martin
 No Room at the Inn (1948) - Mrs. Jarvis (uncredited)
 Marry Me! (1949) - Mrs. Perrins
 Adam and Evalyn (1949) - Mrs. Parker
 The Twenty Questions Murder Mystery (1950) - Olive Tavy (uncredited)
 Paul Temple's Triumph (1950) - Mrs. Weston
 Gone to Earth (1950) - Aunt Prowde
 No Trace (1950) - Landlady
 She Shall Have Murder (1950) - Mrs. Hawthorne
 Out of True (1951, Short) - Mrs. Green
 Hindle Wakes (1952) - Mrs. Hollins
 The Wild Heart (1952) - Aunt Prowde
 Death Goes to School (1953) - Miss Hopkinson
 Melba (1953) - Aunt Catherine
 Bang! You're Dead (1954) - Mrs. Moxted
 The Black Rider (1954) - Mrs. Marsh
 Jumping for Joy (1956) - Landlady (uncredited)
 The Feminine Touch (1956) - Sister Snow
 Tiger in the Smoke (1956) - Lucy Cash
 The Good Companions (1957) - Mrs. Jimmy Nunn
 Sea Wife (1957) - Elderly Nun
 Hell Drivers (1957) - Mrs. Yately - Tom's Mother
 The Surgeon's Knife (1957) - Mrs. Waring
 Bachelor of Hearts (1958) - Mrs. Upcott
 Room at the Top (1959) - Aunt
 Horrors of the Black Museum (1959) - Aggie
 The Rough and the Smooth (1959) - Hotel Manageress
 Identity Unknown (1960) - Matron
 Night Without Pity (1961) - Mother
 Echo of Barbara (1961) - Mrs. Roscoe

References

1896 births
1964 deaths
Actresses from Manchester
English film actresses
English television actresses
20th-century English actresses
20th-century British businesspeople